"You Don't Want Me Anymore" is a 1982 song by Steel Breeze from their self-titled debut album. The song was released as a single in the United States and made it to number 16 on the Billboard Hot 100 singles chart.

Background
"Don't You Want Me Anymore" was aided by a memorable video that was a hit on early MTV. It was also the last chart single ever produced by Kim Fowley.

Chart performance

References 

1982 singles
1982 songs
RCA Records singles